Speedruns are popular for a large variety of games. Most high-level speedruns have been performed by members of online communities. The speedrunning community originated on discussion forums in the late 1990s and early 2000s, where the fastest routes through early first-person shooters were discussed. Later on, as speedrunning became more popular, specific video games became known as common speedrunning candidates. Some modern indie games are explicitly designed for speedrunning.

Doom 

December 1993 saw the release of id Software's Doom. Among some of its major features, like its then-exceptional graphics, LAN and Internet-based multiplayer support, and user modification possibilities, it also gave the players the ability to record demo files of their playthrough. This particular feature was first picked up by Christina "Strunoph" Norman in January 1994 when she launched the LMP Hall of Fame website.

This site was, however, quickly obsoleted by the DOOM Honorific Titles, launched in May 1994 by Frank Stajano, which introduced the first serious competition between players. This site would create the basis for all DOOM demo-sites that would follow. The DHT were designed around a notion of earning titles by successfully recording a particular type of demo on pre-determined maps in the IWADs. These 'exams' became very popular as the player had to earn each title by sending in a demo of the feat to one of the site's judges to justify their application. Doom II was released in October 1994, and the DHT conformed to the new additions as well as the new Doom version releases. At the height of its popularity, the DHT had many different categories and playing styles. For example, playing with only the fists and pistol while killing all monsters on a map became known as Tyson mode, named after the heavyweight boxer Mike Tyson. Pacifist-mode consisted of playing without intentionally harming any monsters. Each category had easy, medium, and hard difficulty maps for players to get randomly chosen for.

In November 1994, Doom's speedrunning scene took off, in the form of the COMPET-N website. Its creator, Simon Widlake, intended the site to be a record scoreboard for a variety of Doom-related achievements, but unlike its predecessors, they all centered around one key idea: speed. Players were required to run through Dooms levels as fast as possible in order to attain a spot on the constantly updated COMPET-N scoreboards which eventually made Doom one of the most popular games for speedrunning.

Like the DOOM Honorific Titles, this site experienced multiple location changes over time; it was even at Cdrom.com for a while before István Pataki took over as maintainer and moved the site to the now-defunct FTP server ftp.sch.bme.hu. From there on, since early 1998, it was in the hands of Ádám Hegyi, who has been the maintainer ever since. It was located for some time at Doom2.net. In 2012, COMPET-N player Zvonimir 'fx' Bužanić took over maintaining the site and re-created a new database for WADs and PWADs. It is currently located at http://www.doom.com.hr/compet-n.

As of March 2006, COMPET-N contains a total amount of 6072 demos (on both official and custom maps), accounting for a total time of 462 hours, 8 minutes and 20 seconds.

In September 2000, Doug 'Opulent' Merrill opened up a new era of Doom speedrunning with the Doomed Speed Demos Archive (DSDA). Unlike COMPET-N, which requires players to use original executable and restricted competition to a handful of WADs, this new archive supported competition for any WAD, with any executable or source port. For 7 years this initial incarnation of DSDA kept track of the runs submitted by the community, displaying the data in a series of news updates, along with occasional commentary by the maintainer. The work of maintaining the archive was performed manually, and, as time went on, the burden of maintenance increased. To alleviate this issue, and to improve usability of the archive itself, Andy Olivera began working on a second iteration of DSDA, which became available in November 2008. This coincided with a large increase in Doom speedrunning interest, with the annual demo count increasing from approximately 750 in 2008 to nearly 2000 in 2009. While a significant improvement over the original archive, this second version still lacked modern features, such as leaderboards and more advanced stat tracking. Work on a third incarnation began in January 2017, driven by Ryan 'Kraflab' Krafnick. The new DSDA currently mirrors the old archive but is still in active development. This latest iteration is located at https://www.dsdarchive.com.

As of November 2022, DSDA hosted 76,267 demos with a total time of 8,152 hours, 52 minutes, and 8 seconds, with a total of 1092 speedruns.

Quake 

Quake was the only game to rival Doom as the most popular game to speedrun. People first started recording demos of Quake playthroughs when it was released in June 1996 and sharing them with others on the demos/e directory in Cdrom.com's Quake file hierarchy. There were two distinct kinds of demos: those in which the player killed all monsters and found all secrets on the map (called 100% demos) and those in which the player ignored these goals in order to finish the level as fast as possible (called runs). All levels were, at that time, recorded solely on the "Nightmare" difficulty level, the highest in the game.

In April 1997, Nolan "Radix" Pflug first started the Nightmare Speed Demos web site to keep track of the fastest demos. The first Quake Done Quick of the game, carrying over one level's finishing statistics to the next. The run ended up finishing the entire game on Nightmare difficulty in 0:19:49; an astonishing feat at that time. It received widespread attention from gaming magazines, being distributed with free CDs that usually came with them. This popularized speedrunning for a much larger audience than before and attracted many newcomers. Not all of those newcomers agreed with the old-timers' dogma that runs should be made on the hardest possible skill level. Thus, in August 1997, Quake Page came to be, run by Gunnar "Muad'Dib" Andre Mo and specializing in "Easy" difficulty runs. One month after that, the famous Quake Done Quick movie was superseded by a new movie called Quake Done Quicker, on September 14, 1997, which improved the game's fastest playthrough time to 0:16:35.

In April 1998, Nolan and Gunnar merged their pages, thus creating Speed Demos Archive, which today is still the central repository for Quake speed demos of any kind. Ever since its creation, a large variety of tricks have been discovered in the Quake physics, which kept players interested even up to today, more than two decades after Quake's release. Subsequently, Quake Done Quick with a Vengeance was released on September 13, 2000, which featured a complete run-through Quake in the hugely improved time of 0:12:23.

As of March 2006, Speed Demos Archive contains a total amount of 8481 demos (on both official and custom maps), accounting for a total time of 253 hours, 44 minutes and 39 seconds. The fastest minimalist single-segment completion times that have been recorded thus far, as of June 10, 2006, are 0:13:46 for the easy difficulty run and 0:19:50 for the nightmare difficulty run, both by long-time Quake speedrunner Connor Fitzgerald. The 100% single-segment completion times are 0:46:02 for the easy difficulty run and 1:09:33 for the nightmare difficulty run, respectively Marlo Galinski and Justin Fleck.

Quake Done Quick 

An important aspect of the Quake speedrunning community is Quake Done Quick, a collection of movies in which the game is finished as fast as possible with special rules and aims. Unlike the normal records listed above, these movies are created one level at a time rather than in one continuous play session; as such, it is possible for multiple people to help create the movie by sending in demos of individual levels, and much faster times can be aimed for as the segmentation allows one to easily try again upon committing an error. It also allows runners to only have to focus on a small portion of the game rather than all of it.

These movies are by far more popular than the conventional records, both in the community itself and outside of it. Some of them, most notably the movies that feature a fast playthrough of the game on the Nightmare difficulty level without additional voluntary challenges, have even been distributed with gaming magazines and posted on news sites. Slashdot has published an announcement of the then newly created Quake Done Quick with a Vengeance movie on its front page. Out of all the series' movies, this one is also the most popular. In it, the entire game is finished in 0:12:23 on "Nightmare" difficulty, the hardest in the game. This run succeeded Quake Done Quicker and the original Quake done Quick movie, in which the game was finished in respectively 0:16:35 and 0:19:49. The main reason for the latest installment being over 4 minutes faster, an improvement that surpassed the initial expectations of the runners, was the discovery of bunny hopping, which allowed runners to attain a much higher speed in most levels and even made it possible to save rockets or grenades for jumps that could now be done without them. This movie is currently being improved by new and old runners for a production called Quake done Quick with a Vengeance Part II. As of May 2006, the improvements that have been made thus far would result in a time of 0:11:32 for the entire game, an improvement of 51 seconds.

Some of the productions have been turned into Machinima movies, using so-called "recams" (showing the run from preset camera perspectives rather than the first-person view) and sometimes even custom skins, models, and a script to turn them into films rather than speedrun videos.

Metroid series 
Super Metroid (Nintendo, 1994) became popular among speedrunners due to the emergence of console emulators with demo-recording features. In normal Super Metroid gameplay, the player may find certain items such as "high-jump boots". Since the path through the map is non-linear, it is complicated to find the most efficient speed-running routes: areas with seemingly essential power-ups can be bypassed at the expense of improved mobility. This drove the discovery of sequence breaking, in which a player can acquire power-ups before the game design intends, allowing whole sections of the map to be skipped.

Because the Metroid series rewards players for completing the game faster, groups of players were inspired to discuss techniques on message boards such as GameFAQs and to capture and post videos of full playthroughs. Despite internet limitations in the early 2000s, the ability to share video footage of Metroid runs allowed speedrunners to collaborate and learn from one another. It was during online discussions of Metroid Prime that the term "sequence breaking" was first widely used.

Super Mario series 

Early platform games of the Super Mario series are popular in the speedrunning community. Super Mario Bros., Super Mario World, Yoshi's Island and Super Mario 64 are particularly notable for speedrunning accomplishments. Most notable speedruns of Super Mario games are generally carried out without tool-assistance, though speedrunners make frequent use of glitches, memory corruption, and arbitrary code execution (ACE) to make optimal times.

Super Mario Bros. is a notoriously competitive game to speedrun, with the world record held by Niftski, who beat the game in 4:54.798, which is only 0.533 seconds or rather 32 frames shy of the theoretical humanly possible limit which is calculated to be 4:54.265. The speedrun includes multiple frame-perfect inputs in order to clip into walls, flagpoles and warp pipes.

Super Mario World 2: Yoshi's Island is a game that players commonly speedrun at Awesome Games Done Quick. Charlie Hall of Polygon has described speedruns of Yoshi's Island as a "great introduction to the showmanship and the rich community" behind the Games Done Quick marathons. Through exchanging strategies and doing theory routing, the Yoshi's Island speedrunning community collaboratively work on pushing the completion time down.

It is possible to speedrun Super Mario 64 in various ways. Though speedruns exist of people playing through the game as intended, it is possible to skip large portions of Super Mario 64 by using glitches. Using a glitch dubbed the "backwards long jump," (BLJ), and variations on it such as "side backwards long jump" (SBLJ) or "lobby backwards long jump" (LBLJ), the player character can move at very high speeds, which allows the player to clip through walls such that a player can skip almost all levels of the game and beat it in only a few minutes, collecting 0 of the intended 70 stars that are normally required. As of November 19, 2022, the world record for this category, dubbed "0 star," is 6 minutes, 27 seconds and 380 milliseconds, by Japanese speedrunner Kanno. Additionally, many players run an older route that omits one BLJ in favor of using a different, slower glitch, which requires 16 total stars. This gives an additional challenge over the "starless" route, as players must execute difficult glitches while also obtaining the fastest (and in many cases, most difficult) stars in the game. The current world record for this category is held by Suigi, with a time of 14:43.581.

Completing Super Mario 64 100%—i.e., collecting all the game's 120 "stars"—is also a popular method of playing through the game; additionally, completing the game without using BLJs but using other glitches and exploits to obtain 70 stars as quickly as possible is also very popular. Recently, the 120 Stars category has become much more competitive. The world records for 70 and 120 stars are 46:56 (Benji64) and 1:37:35 (Weegee), respectively.

In more recent times, Super Mario Odyssey, released in 2017, has garnered a community of speedrunners. As of May 20, 2022, the game has the fourth most speedrunners of any game on speedrun.com, only trailing Minecraft: Java Edition, Super Mario 64, and ROBLOX: Speed Run 4 Many glitches are used to optimize the times, such as out of bounds clips in the Lake Kingdom, Wooded Kingdom, Snow Kingdom, and Seaside Kingdom, and a jump in the Moon Kingdom skipping the Moon Cave and a boss fight. As of July 26, 2022, the world record for Super Mario Odyssey'''s Any% category is held by Tyron18 with a time of 56 minutes, 55 seconds.

 Mario Kart 
The Mario Kart series also has gained considerable attention from the speedrunning community, and various games have attained considerable amounts of attention. While speedrun.com lists Mario Kart 8 Deluxe as its most popular entry in the series, media coverage has been significant around Mario Kart 64 and Mario Kart Wii as well. The culture around speedrunning and attaining world records for completing all 16 or 32 tracks within the game, individual tracks, and single laps is noted to be extremely competitive. Most Mario Kart games, are also noted for its immense amount of game-breaking shortcuts (with shortcuts known within the wii community as "ultra-shortcuts") which enables for large portions of tracks to be completely skipped, with one course on 64, Choco Mountain, able to have one of its laps completed under 6 seconds, and another course in 64, Wario Stadium, can have a lap completed in less than 1 second.

 The Legend of Zelda series 
The original The Legend of Zelda is a popular speedrunning candidate. Any%{{refn|group=Note |name=Any|"Any%" refers to beating a game without having to play through any optional content, and, in Super Metroid's case, without the use of major glitches.}} speedruns of this game involve a great deal of movement optimization and item drop management, as well as some amount of luck. Speedrunners rely heavily on having bombs with which to defeat high-level enemies. A common glitch used in speedruns of this game involves clipping through walls while the screen is scrolling.The Legend of Zelda: A Link to the Past, the third game in the series, can be beaten within two minutes by using particularly advantageous glitches.

The fourth game in the series, The Legend of Zelda: Link's Awakening, can be beaten in under two minutes using arbitrary code execution (ACE). The DX version of the game, which added colored graphics, an extra dungeon, and more side quests, and removed the well-known "screen warping" glitch, can be beaten in under three minutes using ACE. The world record for the main Any% category, which bans the use of wrong warps, saving and quitting and then re-entering the file, or going out of bounds, is 48 minutes and 59 seconds, held by TGH. The game's 2019 remake for the Nintendo Switch has also become somewhat popular for speedruns.

More recently, The Legend of Zelda: Breath of the Wild has been a popular subject for speedrunners due to its non-linear format, which allows the game to be beaten in less than half an hour with only minor glitches. In particular, the French (France) version of the game is used frequently in Any% speedrunning because the voice acting runs slightly faster than in other versions (e.g. 3.967 seconds faster than the English version). The current Any% record is held by Player5 at 23 minutes, 51 seconds. In 2021 the speedrunning community released a segmented Any% speedrun which is supposedly the best theoretical time at 22 minutes and 44 seconds, though development has continued and the best possible time currently sits at 22 minutes and 30 seconds with other categories such as Master Mode Any%, Bug Limit Any% and All Dungeons also being worked on.

The Legend of Zelda: Ocarina of Time

Originally, Ocarina of Time speedruns took several hours to complete, as the game contains many long, mandatory dungeons. Throughout the mid-2000s, the Speed Demo Archives community discovered various glitches and sequence breaks in the game that allowed players to skip large portions of it. For instance, the Door of Time Skip allows the player to skip the child Link dungeons by doing a precise side hop through the Door of Time, which has a slight opening in the corner of it. In 2012, the "Wrong Warp" glitch was discovered. The complicated trick has many uses, the most famous being the wrong warp from the Great Deku Tree, the first dungeon, to Ganon's Castle after Ganondorf has been defeated. This allows the game to be beaten as child Link, which allows for the game to be completed very quickly.

Speedruns of Ocarina of Time are dependent on the console the game is played on and what language the game is being played in. There are many different Nintendo-released versions of the game on a plethora of consoles, with each console having many advantages and disadvantages over each other. For the Any% category, runs have primarily been done on the Japanese Wii Virtual Console version of the game. The Virtual Console has both faster loading times and less lag than the Nintendo 64 version of the game, although it takes longer to reset the game on Virtual Console. Runs used to be done mainly on the English version of Ocarina of Time until runners realized that in order to compete with Japanese players' times, they would have to use that version of the game because the text scrolls faster on the Japanese version of the game than it does on the English version. In that regard, the Chinese iQue Player version of Ocarina of Time has both faster loading times and faster scrolling text than the Nintendo 64 and Virtual Console versions of the game. This was the fastest version for Any% until the discovery of Get-Item Manipulation, a glitch that crashes the game on this system. In 2019, Stale Reference Manipulation, and subsequently arbitrary code execution (ACE), were discovered, thus bringing the Any% time into the single digits. ACE was originally thought to be possible only on the Nintendo 64 version, which is where the record was brought down to about  minutes in mid-2020. The current record was achieved on the Japanese Gamecube Master Quest version of Ocarina of Time. This version of the game has a video file in place of the credits that gets triggered upon the game's completion, and it was discovered that this function can be executed in Kokiri Forest, which cut the record by another 20 seconds.Ocarina of Time has been described as "one of the most intricate and well-documented games for speedrunning" because of its familiarity, as it is one of the most popular games for both speedrunning and casual play, and its wide array of glitches.

 Minecraft Minecraft is a sandbox survival game developed by Mojang Studios and released in 2009. As of August 2022, it is the second most active speedrunning game on Speedrun.com.

Minecraft is notable in that it is procedurally generated, so every run is done on a different world unless a specific seed is provided to the game. As such, unlike most other speedrunning games, where a route through the game is preplanned and carefully executed, speedrunners must learn to play as optimally as possible given their randomly generated world, and getting top times is largely reliant on spawning into extremely lucky worlds. There are also set-seed categories, which are more akin to games like Super Mario 64, but they are less popular. There are also categories that sift through and find the most optimal seeds, which is a subcategory of random seed glitchless. 

The goal of standard Minecraft speedruns is to defeat the game's main boss, the Ender Dragon, and reach the end credits. While Minecraft: Java Edition is the most active and noteworthy version of the game for speedrunning, there are devoted communities for Minecraft (Classic), Minecraft: Bedrock Edition, and Minecraft: Legacy Console Edition as well. There are also Category Extension speedruns, with different, more casual criteria for completing a run, such as obtaining a specific item, completing the game's achievements, or reaching a certain build height.

In addition to splitting random-seed and set-seed categories, standard Minecraft speedruns are split into four categories according to which game version is played, due to different methods and strategies used to complete the game on various versions.

Due to the luck-dependent nature of Minecraft speedruns, there have been several instances of players cheating by modding the game in order to get better luck on their runs overall. Most notably, Dream, a previous world record holder in a Minecraft speedrunning category, was accused of cheating through modding. He subsequently admitted to cheating, though he claimed that it was done unintentionally.

Dark Souls series

Dark SoulsDark Souls, a 2011 game by FromSoftware, is known for its high level of difficulty. Through the use of several intricate skips, glitches, and wrong warps, it is possible to complete an Any% run in under 35 minutes, though average players take dozens of hours playing through the game once. 20-minute speedruns are possible because of a glitch dubbed the "Kiln Skip", which can be used to skip almost the entire second half of the game. The original method for this exploit was removed in an update, but a new method of performing it, which requires the current game update, has also been devised.

 Dark Souls II 
Any% runs of the Dark Souls sequel, Dark Souls II, can be done in under 20 minutes, as it is possible to avoid almost all battles in the game and to move around the world at a "ridiculous pace" using the "binoculars" item. The tricks that make a run this short possible were patched out in "Scholar of the First Sin", but can still be used if current patches are not downloaded.

 Dark Souls III 
Released in 2016, Dark Souls III quickly became another fan-favourite speedrunning game. Currently the Any% record is at just over 30 minutes.

SpelunkySpelunky, a 2008 indie platformer created by Derek Yu, has been a common candidate for speedrunning, with its fastest runs taking between one and two minutes. As Spelunky features a large amount of random procedural generation, speedrunners cannot solely rely on memorization. To have a chance in beating the current record, a speedrunner must get a specific random seed, though despite this, skillful players may recognize repeating level patterns and know how to optimally use the game's items, such as a difficult to use "teleporter" that allows a player to skip large chunks of a level.

Despite the high difficulty of the game, even Spelunky "Hell" levels have been used for speedrunning, with the world record sitting under four minutes. Another highly difficult run of the game is the so-called "eggplant run", in which a player has to go through a specific set of objectives to turn the final boss into an eggplant. This was done solo for the first time in November 2013 by speedrunner Bananasaurus Rex, though it took him 90 minutes. Douglas Wilson of Polygon dubbed this run "2013's most fascinating video game moment".

CupheadCuphead is a run and gun indie video game developed by StudioMDHR, inspired by the rubber hose animation style of the 1920s and 30s. The game features one or two players taking control of animated characters Cuphead and his brother Mugman to fight through several levels that culminate in boss fights in order to repay a gambling debt to the Devil. Cuphead has been noted for its notorious difficulty, and has spawned a dedicated speedrunning community, with The Mexican Runner running the game at AGDQ in 2018 and 2019.Cuphead runs fall under multiple categories, such as Any%, All Flags, All Bosses and Full Clear, and are usually divided by difficulty - "Simple", "Regular" and "Expert". Cuphead runners have also invented many creative categories, such as only using one gun type, completing the game in pacifist mode, and completing the game as fast as possible using the character duplication glitch.

 Portal 
Portal is a Puzzle video game developed by Valve in 2007 as part of The Orange Box. The game's speedrun was popular enough to be run at AGDQ 2019 and SGDQ 2020. Portal is ran on the Source engine and with it comes multiple glitches that players can exploit. One of those glitches is called the "Edge Glitch" in where the player's camera and Hitbox can be separated from each other, which allows the players to get to places they normally can't and can be preserved with the "Save Glitch". Portal is more popularly speedrun due to its simple mechanics and short runtime.

Portal players have been speedrunning for years and have been able to drop the completion time to 5 minutes and 53 seconds, which was executed by speedrunner Can't Even''. There are 4 main categories with different rules and guidelines: Glitchless, Inbounds NoSLA (No Save Load Abuse), Inbounds, and Out Of Bounds.

Notes

References

External links 

Speedrun
Esports games
Speedrunning